Haydon Bridge is a village in Northumberland, England

It can also refer to:

 Old Haydon Bridge, a bridge in that village
New Haydon Bridge, a bridge in that village
 Haydon Bridge Viaduct, a bridge in that village

See also 

 Hayden Bridge (disambiguation)